Gideon Rachman (born 1963) is a British journalist. He became the chief foreign affairs commentator of the Financial Times in July 2006. In 2016, he won the Orwell Prize for political journalism. In the same year, he was awarded with the Commentator Award at the European Press Prize awards.

Life and career
He was born in 1963 in England, son of Jewish South Africans, but spent some of his childhood in South Africa. His uncle, Ronnie Hope, was news editor at The Jerusalem Post. He read History at Gonville and Caius College, Cambridge, gaining a first class honours degree from Cambridge University in 1984. 
While at Gonville and Caius, he was a friend of future MI6 renegade agent Richard Tomlinson, whom he provided with a reference for his Kennedy Scholarship application.

He began his career with the BBC World Service in 1984. From 1988 to 1990, he was a reporter for The Sunday Correspondent newspaper, based in Washington, D.C.

He spent 15 years at The Economist newspaper; first as its deputy American editor, then as its South-east Asia correspondent from a base in Bangkok. He then served as The Economists Asia editor before taking on the post of Britain editor from 1997 to 2000, following which he was posted in Brussels where he penned the Charlemagne European-affairs column.

At The Financial Times, Rachman writes on international politics, with a particular stress on American foreign policy, the European Union and geopolitics in Asia.

Gideon Rachman maintains a blog on the FT site. His brother is Tom Rachman, the author of the novel The Imperfectionists, and his sister Carla is an art historian. Their sister, Emily, died of breast cancer in 2012.

Views 

Rachman is noted for advocating a looser, non-federal European Union. In 2002, he staged a debate in Prospect magazine with Nick Clegg, who was then an MEP for the East Midlands. Clegg argued strongly that Britain should join the European single currency. Rachman disagreed, writing, "I believe the political changes involved in joining the Euro carry enormous risks. I do not believe it is 'progressive' or 'self-confident' to take those risks." More recently, Rachman has argued in the FT that the EU must take a flexible and open approach to the political demands of their member states or face failure. However, during the UK referendum on EU membership, Rachman argued for the UK to vote to stay inside the EU – arguing that the organisation, although flawed, was an important guardian of democratic values and security in Europe. Rachman was also one of the first commentators to predict that the UK would vote to leave the EU.

Rachman has a strong interest in East Asia and the rise of China, and has repeatedly warned that inflexibility on the part of both China and the USA may lead to conflict. He has also often focussed on the challenges to US power around the world.

Rachman twice endorsed Barack Obama for the presidency and has defended his foreign policy. He has also been sceptical of the case for intervention in Syria.

Books 
Rachman's first book, Zero-Sum World was published in 2010 in the United Kingdom. It was published under the title Zero-Sum Future in the United States and translated into seven languages, including Chinese, German and Korean. The book was part history and part prediction. It argued that the thirty years from 1978–2008 had been shaped by a shared embrace of globalisation by the world's major powers that had created a "win-win world", leading to greater peace and prosperity. Rachman predicted that the financial and economic crisis that began in 2008 would lead to a zero-sum world, characterised by increasing tensions between the world's major powers. The New York Times newspaper praised the book as "perhaps the best one-volume account now available of the huge post-Communist spread of personal freedom and economic prosperity."

In August 2016, Rachman published a book entitled Easternisation - War and Peace in the Asian Century. The book argues that 500 years of Western domination of global politics is coming to an end as the result of the rise of new powers in Asia. It focussed on the threat of conflict between the US and China, America's eroding global position and rivalries between China and its neighbours. The book was called  "masterly" by the Sunday Times and "superb" by The Daily Telegraph. British historian, Paul Kennedy, said – "This is truly one of those works you can say you wished our political leaders would read and ponder its great implications." 

In 2022 his third book, The Age of the Strongman, was published in Bodley Head.

Awards 
As well as winning the Orwell and European Press Prize awards, Rachman was named foreign commentator of the year in Britain's comment awards in 2010.  The Observer has also listed him as one of Britain's 300 leading intellectuals. He has been a visiting fellow at the Woodrow Wilson School at Princeton University (1988–89) and at the Nobel Institute in Oslo (2013).

References

External links 

 Gideon Rachman on the Financial Times
 Gideon Rachman on The Guardian
 Containing China by Gideon Rachman

British male journalists
Living people
1963 births
Financial Times people
21st-century British writers
20th-century British writers
English Jews
The Economist people
Alumni of Gonville and Caius College, Cambridge
20th-century British male writers
20th-century British journalists
21st-century British journalists
European Press Prize winners